Heiner Backhaus (born 4 February 1982) is a German football coach and former professional player who coaches BFC Dynamo. As a player, he was a journeyman who played as a defensive midfielder.

Playing career
Born in Witten, West Germany, Backhaus made his professional debut with Hannover 96 on 12 August 2001, against SpVgg Unterhaching, on the 61st minute replacing Nebojša Krupniković.

He played for Rot-Weiss Essen, 1. FC Union Berlin, Borussia Mönchengladbach, DSC Arminia Bielefeld and Kickers Offenbach in Germany, and AEK Larnaca in Cyprus. He played for Valletta from summer 2007 but left the club at the end of the season, after the championship success to join Kitchee SC of Hong Kong.

Honours
Valletta
 Maltese Premier League: 2007–08

References

External links
 
 

1982 births
Living people
People from Witten
Sportspeople from Arnsberg (region)
Association football midfielders
German footballers
2. Bundesliga players
Regionalliga players
Cypriot First Division players
Cypriot Second Division players
FC Schalke 04 players
SV Werder Bremen players
Rot-Weiss Essen players
1. FC Union Berlin players
AEK Larnaca FC players
Hannover 96 players
Hannover 96 II players
Borussia Mönchengladbach II players
Arminia Bielefeld players
Arminia Bielefeld II players
Kickers Offenbach players
Valletta F.C. players
Kitchee SC players
FC Sachsen Leipzig players
Olympiakos Nicosia players
APOP Kinyras FC players
1. FC Lokomotive Leipzig players
Ħamrun Spartans F.C. players
SC Westfalia Herne players
Rabat Ajax F.C. players
German football managers
3. Liga managers
SG Sonnenhof Großaspach managers
Berliner FC Dynamo managers
German expatriate footballers
German expatriate sportspeople in Cyprus
Expatriate footballers in Cyprus
Expatriate footballers in Hong Kong
German expatriate sportspeople in Hong Kong
German expatriate sportspeople in Malta
Expatriate footballers in Malta
Footballers from North Rhine-Westphalia